Paralitherizinosaurus is an extinct genus of therizinosaurid dinosaur from the Late Cretaceous Osoushinai Formation of Hokkaido, Japan. The genus contains a single species, P. japonicus, known from a partial right hand and cervical vertebra. Paralitherizinosaurus represents the youngest therizinosaur known from Japan.

Discovery and naming 

The Paralitherizinosaurus holotype specimen, NMV-52, was discovered in September 2000 in layers of the Osoushinai Formation (Yezo Group) in Nakagawa, Hokkaido, Japan, which dates to the early Campanian age of the late Cretaceous period. The specimen consists of a partial cervical vertebra and the metacarpal I, proximal ends of unguals I and II, and nearly complete ungual III of the right hand.

Some of these remains were first described by Murakami et al. in 2008 as belonging to an indeterminate genus of maniraptoran theropod, possibly with therizinosauroid affinities. In 2022, Kobayashi et al. described Paralitherizinosaurus as a new genus and species of therizinosaurid making it the third therizinosaur found in Japan. This taxon represents the first named therizinosaur from Japan, with two other unnamed specimens being known. The generic name, "Paralitherizinosaurus", combines the Greek words "paralos", meaning "tidal" and "therizo", meaning "scythe", and the Latin "sauros", meaning "lizard". The specific name, "japonicus", refers to the taxon's discovery in Japan.

Classification 
In their phylogenetic analyses, Kobayashi et al. (2022) recovered Paralitherizinosaurus as a member of a clade containing Therizinosaurus, Suzhousaurus, and an unnamed therizinosaurid from the Bissekty Formation of Uzbekistan. The cladogram below displays the results of their phylogenetic analyses.

References

External links 
 

Therizinosaurs
Late Cretaceous dinosaurs of Asia
Campanian genera
Fossils of Japan
Cretaceous Japan
Fossil taxa described in 2022